Puerto Rican rapper Anuel AA has released five studio albums, one mixtape, thirty-six singles (including nine as a featured artist) and three promotional singles.

Albums

Studio albums

Singles

As lead artist

As featured artist

Promotional singles

Other charted songs

Notes

References 

Discographies of Puerto Rican artists
AA, Anuel